Jewell Hall is a historic building located on the campus of William Jewell College at Liberty, Clay County, Missouri. It was built between 1850 and 1853, and is a three-story, modified "H"-plan, Classical Revival style brick and Missouri limestone building.  The building measures 120 feet in length and 66 feet in width. It features a colonnade of square columns which spans a recessed, central portico.  The interior of Jewell Hall was completely remodelled in 1946–1948.

It was listed on the National Register of Historic Places in 1978.

References

University and college buildings on the National Register of Historic Places in Missouri
Neoclassical architecture in Missouri
School buildings completed in 1853
Buildings and structures in Clay County, Missouri
National Register of Historic Places in Clay County, Missouri
Liberty, Missouri
William Jewell College